Fred Carter (birth unknown – death unknown) was an English professional rugby league footballer who played in the 1910s and 1920s.

Background
Fred Carter was born in Castleford, West Riding of Yorkshire, England.

Playing career

International honours

County honours
Fred Carter won a cap for Yorkshire while at Batley; he played  in the 30-12 victory over Cumberland in the County Championship match during the 1921–22 season at Thrum Hall, Halifax on Monday 14 November 1921.

Championship final appearances
Fred Carter played  in Batley's 13-7 victory over Wigan in the 1923–24 Championship Final during the 1923–24 season, at The Cliff, Broughton, Salford on Saturday 3 May 1924, in front of a crowd of 13,729.

County League appearances
Fred Carter played in Batley's victory in the Yorkshire County League during the 1923–24 season, and as a runner-up during the 1921–22 season and 1925–26 season.

County Cup Final appearances
Fred Carter played  in Batley's 0-5 defeat by York in the 1922–23 Yorkshire County Cup Final during the 1922–23 season at Headingley Rugby Stadium, Leeds on Saturday 2 December 1922, in front of a crowd of 33,719, and played left-, i.e. number 11, in the 8-9 defeat by Wakefield Trinity in the 1924–25 Yorkshire County Cup Final during the 1924–25 season at Headingley Rugby Stadium, Leeds on Saturday 22 November 1924, in front of a crowd of 25,546.

Club career

References

External links
Search for "Carter" at rugbyleagueproject.org
Fred Carter Memory Box Search at archive.castigersheritage.com
Carter Memory Box Search at archive.castigersheritage.com
Search for "Fred Carter" at britishnewspaperarchive.co.uk

Batley Bulldogs players
Castleford Tigers players
English rugby league players
Leeds Rhinos players
Place of birth missing
Place of death missing
Rugby league forwards
Rugby league locks
Rugby league players from Castleford
Rugby league second-rows
Rugby league wingers
Year of birth missing
Year of death missing
Yorkshire rugby league team players